Matome Trevor Mathiane (born 21 October 1988) is a South African soccer player who plays as a defender for the Lamontville Golden Arrows in the South African Premier Division. He is the Arrows' captain.

References

External links
 

1988 births
Living people
Lamontville Golden Arrows F.C. players
South African soccer players
Association football defenders
South African Premier Division players
Sportspeople from Limpopo